Double jump may refer to:

 Double jump (cheerleading), performing the same jump twice in a row in cheerleading
 Double jump (figure skating), two revolutions in a figure skating jump
 A bid that skips two levels in contract bridge
 Double jump (video gaming), a common mechanic in video games which allows the player's character to jump for a second time whilst still in mid air